The Jeay Sindh Students’ Federation  abbreviated as JSSF, is the student wing of various separatist organizations struggling for the freedom of Sindhudesh following the ideology of G. M. Syed, founded in 1969.  JSSF was a nationalist outfit which emerged from Anti-Unitary System Struggle in the late 1960s and later joined G. M. Syed in his ideology of a separate homeland for Sindhis in 1972. Since then, it has been working as the students’ front of the Jeay Sindh or Sindhudesh movement.

History

Foundation

JSSF is the student wing of various separatist organizations struggling for the freedom of Sindhudesh following the ideology of G. M. Syed, founded in 1969.

Moto
JSSF is working for the rights of Sindhi students and is also an active front for the ongoing struggle for the freedom of Sindhudesh from Pakistan. "An Independent state of Sindhudesh", "Secularism", "Nationalism" and "Better Education – Better Politics" are the slogans of JSSF.

Struggle

4 March 1967
Thousands of Sindhi student activists outraged against the Unitary Provincial setup, imposed by Martial law regime, challenged the dictatorship of Field Marshal Ayoub Khan and launched a struggle against the One Unit in 1967. On the 4th of the March 1967, a massive procession taken out by the students marched from the University of Sindh, Jamshoro campus to Hyderabad. While the procession was on its way to the Hyderabad from Jamshoro, the police under the instructions of Martial law administration unleashed brutal force against the protesters leaving 17 of them injured and 200 arrested at the place of the incident. This incident proved to be the day of the emergence of the Sindhi nationalist politics and lead to the foundation of JSSF. Various factions of JSSF mark this day as the "day of the student struggle of Sindh" across Sindh till today.

Operation

Thori Phatak Incident

Five activists of the Jeay Sindh Students Federation were shot dead by the security forces at Thori Phatak, near Manjhand, district Jamshoro, on 17 October 1984, when they were on their way to Larkana. They dead students included Amanullah Vistro, Maalik Khushik, Zakaria Memon, Anwar Abbasi, and Mithu Buledi.

Kill and Dump
The bullet-riddled body of a student of Sindh University Asif Panhwar, who was also a leader of JSMM's student wing JSSF, was found in Larkana on 26 November 2014. Asif Panhwar, 23, was allegedly whisked away by police and plain-clothed men from Hyderabad on 15 August 2014.  Afzal Panhwar, who remained in the custody of the security agencies for one year, was again arrested and within some hours he was shot dead by plain clothed persons believed to be from the secret agencies. He was a leader of the Jeay Sindh Student Federation (JSSF) affiliated with the JSMM. Another student leader of JSMM's JSSF Shakeel Khunharo was abducted by LeA on 6 October 2014, and his bullet-riddled mutilated body was dumped along roadside near Karachi.
 Hafeez Pirzado, the current chairman of Jeay Sindh Students’ Federation (one affiliated with JSMM faction of Sindhudesh Movement) was sentenced a term of 37 years in prison on 12 August 2016 by Anti-Terrorism Court Larkana on the charges of treachery against the state of Pakistan. He is imprisoned in the Central Jail, Hyderabad.

Factions
 Jeay Sindh Students' Federation of Jeay Sindh Qaumi Mahaz Arisar and Jeay Sindh Qaumi Mahaz Bashir Khan commonly known as JSSF (JSQM-A) and JSSF (JSQM-B)
 Jeay Sindh Students' Federation of Jeay Sindh Muttahida Mahaz commonly known as JSSF (JSMM)
 Jeay Sindh Students' Federation of Jeay Sindh Mahaz commonly known as JSSF (JSM)

See also
Sindhudesh
Jeay Sindh Muttahida Mahaz
Jeay Sindh Qaumi Mahaz

References

Student politics in Pakistan
Separatism in Pakistan
Sindhi nationalism